General Dalbir Singh Suhag, PVSM, UYSM, AVSM, VSM, ADC (born 28 December 1954) is the former Indian High Commissioner to Seychelles and a former Chief of Army Staff of the Indian Army. He was the 25th Chief of the Army Staff (COAS) of the Indian Army, serving from 31 July 2014 to 31 December 2016, and Vice Chief of the Army Staff prior to that.

Early life and education
Singh is a third generation soldier who was born on 28 December 1954 to Ishari Devi and Ch Ramphal Singh, a Risaldar-major in the 18th Cavalry Regiment of the Indian Army. He is from Bishan village of Jhajjar district, Haryana, India.

Singh completed his primary education in his native village and then moved to Sainik School, Chittorgarh, Rajasthan for his secondary education in 1965 before joining the National Defence Academy in 1970. He holds master's degrees in Management Studies and Strategic Studies and has also completed the Executive Course offered by the Asia-Pacific Center for Security Studies in Hawaii as well as the Senior Mission Leaders Course of the United Nations Peace Keeping Centre in Nairobi.

Military career

Singh was commissioned into the 4th battalion of the 5 Gorkha Rifles on 16 June 1974. He was an instructor at the Indian Military Academy, Dehradun after which he served as a company commander during Operation Pawan in Jaffna, Sri Lanka. He commanded 33 Rashtriya Rifles in Nagaland. He then commanded the 53 Infantry Brigade, which was involved in counter-insurgency operations in the Kashmir Valley from July 2003 to March 2005, and the 8th Mountain Division in Kargil from October 2007 to December 2008. He was also appointed as the Inspector General of the Special Frontier Force.

Singh has completed various Indian and foreign courses including LDMC at College of Defence Management in 1997–98, National Defence College in 2006, Executive Course in USA in 2005 and Senior Mission Leaders Course (UN) in Kenya in 2007.

General Officer Commanding III Corps
Singh took command of the III Corps, headquartered in Dimapur, in northeast Indian state of Nagaland. In 2012, he was put under a 'Discipline and Vigilance' ban by the then outgoing Army Chief General V K Singh. Singh's unit had allegedly botched up a military intelligence operation in Jorhat, Assam, which happened during his tenure as the III Corps commander. The 'Discipline and Vigilance' ban was, however, subsequently revoked by the next army chief General Bikram Singh with the concurrence of Minister of Defence A K Antony.

General Officer Commanding-in-Chief Eastern Command
After promotion to Army Commander grade, he took over as the General Officer-Commanding-in-Chief (GOC-in-C) Eastern Army based in Kolkata on 16 June 2012 and served it that capacity until 31 December 2013.

Vice Chief of the Army staff
Singh replaced Lt Gen S K Singh as the Vice Chief of Army staff (VCOAS) on 31 December 2013. He held this post until 30 July 2014.

Chief of the Army staff
On 14 May 2014, Government of India announced its decision to appoint Singh as next Chief of the Army staff. His name was recommended by the Defence Ministry of India to the Appointments Committee of Cabinet (ACC) which was headed by then Prime Minister Manmohan Singh. He assumed charge as Chief of the Army staff on 31 July 2014 following the retirement of General Bikram Singh, and served in that capacity until 31 December 2016. He is the second officer from the Gorkha Rifles to become the Chief of the Army, after the late Field Marshal Sam Manekshaw.

Row over appointment 
On 7 July 2014, the Supreme Court of India declined to stay or stall Singh's appointment as next Army Chief, in response to a petition filed by Lt Gen Ravi Dastane challenging his appointment as Eastern Army Commander. The Bench observed that there is no reason and urgency to stay the appointment  and that the petition pertained to Singh's appointment as army commander and hence issues relating to appointment of army chief did not have to be dealt with at this stage. Attorney General Mukul Rohatgi representing the Government of India, also justified the appointment, arguing that there was nothing in the allegations levelled and that Singh fulfilled all the criteria for the post including being senior-most in the seniority list. He also said that the ban imposed on Singh in 2012 had been lifted and he had been discharged from all charges. Earlier on 10 June 2014, the central government had told the Supreme Court that the alleged lapses which were made as grounds to impose disciplinary ban on Army Vice Chief Dalbir Singh by then Army Chief V K Singh, were "premeditated", "vague" and "illegal".

Honours and decorations

Military awards

General Suhag has received the following medals and decorations throughout his military career:
 Param Vishisht Seva Medal for services of exceptionally high order to the nation.
 Uttam Yudh Seva Medal for counter-insurgency operations in the North-Eastern states in addition to the conventional operational role along the Indo-China border.
 Ati Vishisht Seva Medal for commanding Mountain Division in the Kargil-Dras sector at high altitude near Line of Control.
 Vishisht Seva Medal for intense counter-insurgency operations in the Kashmir valley.
Legion of Merit (Degree of Commander) for exceptionally meritorious service as CoAS of the Indian Army.

Dates of rank

Personal life
Singh is married to Namita Suhag. She is a graduate from Delhi University with a degree in political science. The couple have three children, two daughters and a son. Known as a sportsperson, he takes special interest in physical activities like riding and swimming. His personal hobbies include daily run of 10 km, horse-riding and playing golf.

See also
List of Chiefs of Army Staff

References

External links

 General Dalbir Singh, PVSM, UYSM, AVSM, VSM at the Indian Army official website
 Ascent of a General: A Profile of India’s 26th Army Chief at the Press Information Bureau official website

1954 births
Living people
Indian Army personnel
People from Jhajjar district
Recipients of the Param Vishisht Seva Medal
Recipients of the Uttam Yudh Seva Medal
Recipients of the Ati Vishisht Seva Medal
Chiefs of Army Staff (India)
Sainik School alumni
Indian generals
National Defence Academy (India) alumni
Vice Chiefs of Army Staff (India)
Recipients of the Vishisht Seva Medal
National Defence College, India alumni
College of Defence Management alumni